Romulus, graphically rendered as  , is a 2020 Italian television series created by Matteo Rovere about the founding of Rome. The show is notable for using archaic Latin instead of Italian.

Produced by Sky Italia, Cattleya, and Groenlandia, two episodes of the series premiered at the 2020 Rome Film Festival. The series was first broadcast in Italy on Sky Atlantic on 6 November 2020. In April 2021 it was renewed for a second season. The series was sold in over 40 countries.

Cast

Main 

  as Yemos (seasons 1-2)  Prince of Alba Longa and Enitos' twin brother
  as Wiros (seasons 1-2) Slave from Velia participating to the Lupercalia.
 Marianna Fontana as Ilia (seasons 1-2) Amulius' daughter and Vestal priestess.
  as Amulius / Servios (seasons 1-2) King Numitor's younger brother, later known as Servios.
  as Gala (season 1) Amulius' wife and Ilia's mother.
  as Silvia (seasons 1-2) King Numitor's daughter and Yemos and Enitos' mother.
 Valentina Bellè as Hersilia (season 2) Leader of the Sabine priestesses.
 Emanuele Di Stefano as Titus Tatius (season 2) Sancus' son and King of the Sabines.
 Max Malatesta as Sabos (season 2) Titus' advisor and commander of his army.
 Massimo Foschi as Aranth (season 2) Old Etruscan in the Land of Tuscia who heals Yemos.

Recurrent 

  as Enitos (season 1) Silvia's son and Yemos' twin brother.
  as Spurius (season 1) King of Velia and Amulius' ally.
 Yorgo Voyagis as Numitor (seasons 1-2) King of Alba Longa, Silvia's father and Yemos and Enitos' grandfather.
  as Cnaeus (season 1) Slave from Velia and king of the Luperci.
 Emilio De Marchi as Ertas (season 1) King of Gabii and Lausus' father.
 Marlon Joubert as Lausus (seasons 1-2) Ertas' son.
  as she-Wolf (seasons 1-2) Leader of the Ruminales.
 Demetra Avincola as Deftri (stagioni 1-2) Young warrior of the Ruminales, attracted to Wiros.
 Francesco Santagada as Maccus (seasons 1-2) Last survivor of the Luperci besides Yemos and Wiros. later advisor and lieutenant of the kings together with Herenneis.
 Piergiuseppe di Tanno as Herenneis (seasons 1-2) Warrior of the Ruminales, later advisor and lieutenant of the kings together with Maccus.
 Anna Chiara Colombo as Tarinkri (seasons 1-2) Warrior of the Ruminales.
 Valerio Malorni as Adieis (seasons 1-2) Warrior and healer of the Ruminales.
 Pietro Micci as Attus (seasons 1-2) Priest of Mars and warrior who trains Ilia to fighting.
 Ludovica Nasti as Vibia (season 2) The youngest among the Sabine priestesses.
  as Atys (season 2) King of Satricum.

Production
The first season of the series was greenlighted in 2019 and it was shot in 28 weeks in Rome. It was originally shot in Old Latin.

Reception
The series won the 2021 Nastro d'Argento for best Italian TV series.

Other media
Starting from October 29, 2020, a trilogy of novels that expands the narrative universe, an unpublished cross-media project for Italy, has been published by HarperCollins.

See also
 The First King: Birth of an Empire, Rovere's 2019 film about the story of Romulus and Remus spoken in Old Latin.

References

External links
 

2020 Italian television series debuts
2020s Italian drama television series
Epic television series
Sky Atlantic (Italy) television programmes